Suphisellus is a genus of beetles in the family Noteridae, containing the following species:

 Suphisellus anticicollis Guignot, 1950:153
 Suphisellus balzani (Régimbart, 1889a:259) (Canthydrus balzani)
 Suphisellus bicolor (Say, 1830:33) (Noterus bicolor)
 Suphisellus binotatus (Fleutiaux & Sallé, 1890:370) (Canthydrus binotatus)
 Suphisellus brevicornis (Sharp, 1882a:273) (Canthydrus brevicornis)
 Suphisellus bruchi (Zimmermann, 1919:115) (Canthydrus bruchi)
 Suphisellus brunneus Guignot, 1950:152
 Suphisellus canthydroides Guignot, 1940:9
 Suphisellus cribrosus (Régimbart, 1903:59) (Canthydrus cribrosus)
 Suphisellus curtus (Sharp, 1882a:272) (Canthydrus curtus)
 Suphisellus dilutus (Sharp, 1882a:272) (Canthydrus dilutus)
 Suphisellus epleri Arce-Pérez & Baca, 2017:278
 Suphisellus flavolineatus (Régimbart, 1889a:262) (Canthydrus flavolineatus)
 Suphisellus flavopictus (Régimbart, 1889a:260) (Canthydrus flavopictus)
 Suphisellus gibbulus (Aubé, 1838:414) (Suphis gibbulus)
 Suphisellus globosus (Régimbart, 1903:62) (Canthydrus globosus)
 Suphisellus grammicus (Sharp, 1882a:274) (Canthydrus grammicus)
 Suphisellus grammopterus (Régimbart, 1889c:390) (Canthydrus grammopterus)
 Suphisellus grossus (Sharp, 1882a:270) (Canthydrus grossus)
 Suphisellus hieroglyphicus Zimmermann, 1921:187
 Suphisellus insularis (Sharp, 1882a:270) (Canthydrus insularis)
 Suphisellus levis (Fall, 1909:99) (Canthydrus levis)
 Suphisellus lineatus (Horn, 1871:329) (Suphis lineatus)
 Suphisellus majusculus (Sharp, 1882b:6) (Canthydrus majusculus)
 Suphisellus melzeri Zimmermann, 1925:254
 Suphisellus minimus Gschwendtner, 1922:135
 Suphisellus neglectus Young, 1979:419
 Suphisellus nigrinus (Aubé, 1838:411) (Hydrocanthus nigrinus)
 Suphisellus obesus (Régimbart, 1903:59) (Canthydrus obesus)
 Suphisellus obscuripennis (Régimbart, 1889a:257) (Canthydrus obscuripennis)
 Suphisellus ovatus (Sharp, 1882a:270) (Canthydrus ovatus)
 Suphisellus parsonsi Young, 1952:157
 Suphisellus penthimus Guignot, 1957:41
 Suphisellus pereirai Guignot, 1958:37
 Suphisellus phenax Guignot, 1954:198
 Suphisellus pinguiculus (Régimbart, 1903:62) (Canthydrus pinguiculus)
 Suphisellus puncticollis (Crotch, 1873:397) (Suphis puncticollis)
 Suphisellus remator (Sharp, 1882a: 272) (Canthydrus remator)
 Suphisellus rotundatus (Sharp, 1882a:270) (Canthydrus rotundatus)
 Suphisellus rubripes (Boheman, 1858:19) (Hydrocanthus rubripes)
 Suphisellus rufulus (Zimmermann, 1921:188)
 Suphisellus sculpturatus (Sharp, 1882a:269) (Canthydrus sculpturatus)
 Suphisellus sexnotatus (Régimbart, 1889a:259) (Canthydrus sexnotatus)
 Suphisellus similis Zimmermann, 1921:188
 Suphisellus simoni (Régimbart, 1889b:383) (Canthydrus simoni)
 Suphisellus subsignatus (Sharp, 1882a:271) (Canthydrus subsignatus)
 Suphisellus tenuicornis (Chevrolat, 1863:199) (Hydrocanthus tenuicornis)
 Suphisellus transversus (Régimbart, 1903:61) (Canthydrus transversus)
 Suphisellus vacuifer Guignot, 1958:37
 Suphisellus varians (Sharp, 1882b:5) (Canthydrus varians)
 Suphisellus variicollis Zimmermann, 1921:187
 Suphisellus vicinus (Sharp, 1882a:2699) (Canthydrus vicinus)

References

 
Noteridae